Leuty is an English surname. Notable people with the surname include:

 David Leuty (born 1960), Canadian bobsledder
 Leon Leuty (1920–1955), English footballer
 Thomas Leuty (1853–1911), British politician

See also
 Luty

English-language surnames